Samuel ben Joseph Uziel (16th–17th century)  was a rabbi and physician of Spanish extraction who officiated as rabbi at Salonica, where he also practised medicine.

References 

16th-century Sephardi Jews
17th-century Sephardi Jews
Rabbis from Thessaloniki
Year of death unknown
16th-century rabbis from the Ottoman Empire
17th-century rabbis from the Ottoman Empire
Year of birth unknown